"Samanyolu" (literally "Milky Way") is a Turkish melody which was a hit in 1968.

"Samanyolu" was the theme music of a 1967 film with the same title. The melody became very popular and the composer Metin Bükey decided to release its record after adding lyrics. He collaborated with Teoman Alpay for the lyrics. It was sung by Berkant Akgürgen (aka Berkant).  The song became very famous in Turkey and earned Berkant a gold record.
 
The next year Dutch singer David Alexandre Winter covered the same song with the title "Oh Lady Mary" and with French lyrics. It was also covered by Dalida and Paul Mauriat. This song was covered also by Italian singer Enrico Musiani as Lady Mary in Italian.

References

Turkish music
Light music compositions
Turkish songs
Songs written for films